The 2e Escadre de Chasse (2nd Fighter Wing) is a fighter formation of the Fighter Brigade of the French Air and Space Force.

EC 2 was set up at Chartres at the end of 1936. Outfitted in early 1937 with a Dewoitine D.500, the wing was reequipped with a Morane Saulnier M.S.406 (MS 406) in April 1939.

Created in November 1945 at Friedrichshafen, it was dissolved on September 9, 1994, at Dijon Air Base, then reformed on September 3, 2015, at Luxeuil Air Base.

It now comprises the Air Force's most elite fighter squadron, Escadron de Chasse 1/2 Cigognes, Escadron de Soutien Technique Aéronautique 2E.004.

History

Storks 
 Groupe de chasse 1/2 Cigognes (1 au 1)
 Escadron de chasse 1/2 Cigognes (01/10/1949 au 09/09/1994)

Côte d'Or 
 Escadron de Chasse 2/2 Côte d'Or (01/05/1951 until 01/10/1957) (01/04/1965 until 01/04/1966)
 CMIR 2/102 Côte d'or (01/04/1966 until 01/11/1968)
 Escadron de Chasse et Transformation 2/2 Côte d'or (01/11/1968 until 01/08/1993)

Alsace
 Groupe de chasse 2/2 Alsace (08/11/1945 until 01/10/1949)
 Escadron de chasse 2/2 Alsace (01/10/1949 until 01/05/1951)
 Escadron de chasse 3/2 Alsace (01/05/1951 until 09/09/1994)

Others
 Groupe de Chasse 3/2 Berry (01/11/1945 until 01/04/1946)
 Groupe de Chasse 4/2 Ile-de-France (01/11/1945 until 01/03/1946)
 Groupe de Chasse 2/18 Saintonge (01/11/1945 until 01/03/1946)
 Escadron de Chasse 3/2 Côte d'Or (01/10/1949 until 01/05/1951)
 Escadron de Chasse 4/2 Coq gaulois (01/10/1949 until 01/04/1950)

Bases
 Friedrichshafen (1945-1947 until 1949)
 Hanoi (1946-1947)
 Nha Trang (1946-1947)
 Coblence (1947 until 1949)
 Aerial Base 102 Dijon-Longvic (1949 until 1994)
 Aerial Base 116 Luxeuil-Saint Sauveur since September 3, 2015

Equipment 

Spitfire Mk.IX ( 1945 until 1947)
P-47 D Thunderbolt (1948)
Vampire FB.5 (1948 until 1954)
Dassault MD-450 Ouragan (1953 until 1955)
North American T-6G (1956 until 1962)
Dassault Mystère IVA (1956 until 1961)
Dassault Mirage IIIC (1961 until 1975)
Dassault Mirage IIIB (1962 until 1986)
Dassault Mirage IIIE (1968 until 1985)
Dassault Mirage IIIBE (1971 until 1986)
Dassault Mirage IIIR (1983 until 1986)
Dassault Mirage 2000C (1984 until 1994)
Dassault Mirage 2000B (1984 until 1994) 
Dassault Mirage 2000-5F (as of 2015)

See also

Major (France)
Chief of Staff of the French Air Force
Frédéric Geille
List of Escadres of the French Air Force

References

External links 
Traditions of the 2e Escadre de Chasse

Military units and formations of the French Air and Space Force
Fighter aircraft units and formations
Military units and formations established in 1936
Military units and formations established in 2015